Jarmo Pentti Kalevi Myllys (born 29 May 1965) is a Finnish former professional ice hockey goaltender. He was drafted by the Minnesota North Stars as their ninth-round pick, #172 overall, in the 1987 NHL Entry Draft. He is currently the goalkeeping coach for Austrian hockey team EC KAC of the EBEL. His jersey number, #35, was retired in Luleå in 2011.

Playing career

Early career
Myllys was born in Savonlinna, and started playing ice hockey for the local team Savonlinnan Pallokerho or SaPKo. He played his first adult season (1982–1983) in SaPko, but moved to Tampere for SM-Liiga games in Ilves. Myllys spent a total of three seasons (1983–1986) with Ilves, then moved to Rauman Lukko where he stayed for two seasons (1986–1988) before moving to the NHL.

NHL career
Myllys gained a spot in the Minnesota North Stars lineup. He played 6 NHL games in the 1988–1989 season but spent most of the year with the North Stars' farmteam, Kalamazoo Wings of the IHL. In his 3 seasons (1988–1991) with North Stars Myllys never played more than 10 games in a season. He spent most of these seasons in the IHL. When the San Jose Sharks were formed in 1991 Myllys moved to San Jose along with several North Stars players in the Dispersal Draft. Myllys played 27 games with the Sharks during the 1991–1992 season. This was his last season in the NHL, as Myllys returned to Finland in 1992.

Return from the NHL
In 1992 Myllys joined the 1 Divisioona team KooKoo, which located in Kouvola. After one season with KooKoo Myllys went to Lukko and stayed there for the 1993–1994 season. After his second season since his return in Finland, Myllys signed to Swedish Elitserien team Luleå HF.

Myllys established himself as a star in Sweden, staying with Luleå for 7 seasons (1994–2001). During that time Myllys won several awards and played twice in the Elitserien all-star game. Myllys also scored two goals in two Elitserien games, which is a rare feat for a goaltender. Myllys returned to Finland in 2001, however.

Jarmo Myllys was signed by Espoo Blues in 2001. He played with the Blues for 2 seasons (2001–2003) with little success. After his time with the Blues, Myllys moved to near his birthplace in order to play with SaiPa and played there for the 2003–2004 season. Myllys played in Elitserien with HV71 in the playoffs, then returned to SaiPa for his final season. Myllys retired from professional ice hockey after the 2004–2005 season.

International play

Myllys made a total of 188 appearances for Finnish national ice hockey team. He played in seven World Championships, three  Winter Olympics, and one Canada Cup. Myllys won a gold medal at the 1995 World Championships, helping Finland win its first world championship.

Career statistics

Regular season and playoffs

International

References

External links
 

1965 births
Living people
Espoo Blues players
Finnish ice hockey goaltenders
Finnish ice hockey world championship gold medalists
HV71 players
Ice hockey players at the 1988 Winter Olympics
Ice hockey players at the 1994 Winter Olympics
Ice hockey players at the 1998 Winter Olympics
Ilves players
Kalamazoo Wings (1974–2000) players
Kansas City Blades players
KooKoo players
Lukko players
Luleå HF players
Medalists at the 1994 Winter Olympics
Medalists at the 1988 Winter Olympics
Medalists at the 1998 Winter Olympics
Minnesota North Stars draft picks
Minnesota North Stars players
Olympic bronze medalists for Finland
Olympic ice hockey players of Finland
Olympic medalists in ice hockey
Olympic silver medalists for Finland
People from Savonlinna
SaiPa players
San Jose Sharks players
SaPKo players
Sportspeople from South Savo